Ionuț Casian Rus (born 20 January 2000) is a Romanian professional footballer who plays as a goalkeeper for Ripensia Timișoara.

Club career
Ionuț Rus started his career at LPS Banatul Timișoara, the club of the Sports High School from his hometown. On 30 January 2016 he signed a 3-year contract with Italian side S.S. Lazio. In the three years spent in Rome the young goalkeeper from Timișoara played 24 matches.

CFR Cluj
On 6 January 2019 Rus signed his first professional contract with the defending champion of Romania, CFR Cluj. He will be under contract with "the railwaymen" until January 2024.

Luceafărul Oradea
On 13 February 2019 CFR Cluj decided to give him the chance to play constantly, loaning him to the second league side CS Luceafărul Oradea. This decision was made due to the tough competition that was on this position in CFR's squad, where the first two choices as a goalkeeper were Giedrius Arlauskis and Jesús Fernández.

Turris Turnu Măgurele
On 9 July 2019 Rus was loaned by CFR Cluj to Turris-Oltul Turnu Măgurele.

International career
Ionuț Rus played for Romania U16 and Romania U18 football teams, now being eligible for Romania U19 team, for which he made his debut on 17 November 2018, in a 3-5 defeat against Greece.

References

External links
 

2000 births
Living people
Sportspeople from Timișoara
Romanian footballers
Romania youth international footballers
Association football goalkeepers
S.S. Lazio players
Liga I players
Liga II players
Liga III players
CFR Cluj players
CS Luceafărul Oradea players
AFC Turris-Oltul Turnu Măgurele players
FC Hermannstadt players
FC Ripensia Timișoara players
Romanian expatriate footballers
Romanian expatriate sportspeople in Italy
Expatriate footballers in Italy